Back to Roots (Gui tu) is a 1994 Hong Kong drama film directed by Raymond Leung. It was entered into the 45th Berlin International Film Festival.

Cast
 Radium Cheung

References

External links

1994 films
1994 drama films
1990s Cantonese-language films
Hong Kong drama films
1990s Hong Kong films